The Colonial Mutual Life building is a heritage-listed former life insurance office located at 118 Macquarie Street, Dubbo in the Dubbo Regional Council local government area of New South Wales, Australia. It is also known as CML Building and 116-120 Macquarie Street. The property is privately owned and was added to the New South Wales State Heritage Register on 2 April 1999.

Description
The three-storey building has been repurposed and, in 2013, the ground floor was used as a cafe, travel agent, and other mixed retail. A dentist occupied some of the upper stories.

Heritage listing 
The Colonial Mutual Life building was listed on the New South Wales State Heritage Register on 2 April 1999.

See also

References

Attribution

External links

New South Wales State Heritage Register
Dubbo
Office buildings in New South Wales
Articles incorporating text from the New South Wales State Heritage Register